World of Music is the sixth studio album released by Japanese hip hop artist Zeebra. It features appearances from Jesse (lead singer of Rize) and Miliyah Kato.

Track listing
 World Of Music(intro)
 
 Reason(Let U Know) feat. Simon & D.O.
 Top Of The World
 Back Stage Boogie feat. Bes, 56 5 & Uzi
 Not Your Boyfriend feat. Jesse (Rize)
 We Leanin’
 Shinin’ Like A Diamond feat. Sphere of Influence&May J.
 Stop Playin’ A Wall
 This Is 4 The Locos feat. DS455&Big Ron
 360° feat. OJ Flow, KM-Markit, Aktion, Braidz, Gotz & Uzi
 Lyrical Gunman
 Everybody Needs Love
 My People feat. Miliyah Kato
 
 Last Song

References

Zeebra albums
2007 albums